The Mowag Spy  is a derivative of the Mowag Piranha 4x4, it is smaller and more lightly armored. Designed as recon vehicle it succeeded as a security vehicle in places like airports.

References

Scout cars of the Cold War
Wheeled armoured fighting vehicles
Armoured fighting vehicles of Switzerland
Abandoned military projects of Switzerland
Military vehicles introduced in the 1980s